Pharoscymnus is a genus of lady beetles in the family Coccinellidae. There are about 11 described species in Pharoscymnus.

Species
These 11 species belong to the genus Pharoscymnus:
 Pharoscymnus angohranensis Duverger, 1983
 Pharoscymnus arabicus Fuersch, 1979
 Pharoscymnus brunneosignatus Mader, 1949
 Pharoscymnus decemplagiatus (Wollaston, 1857)
 Pharoscymnus fleischeri (Weise, 1883)
 Pharoscymnus flexibilis (Mulsant, 1853)
 Pharoscymnus grandcanariensis Uyttenboogart, 1935
 Pharoscymnus ovoideus Sicard, 1929
 Pharoscymnus pharoides Marseul, 1868
 Pharoscymnus setulosus (Chevrolat, 1861)
 Pharoscymnus taoi Sasaji, 1967

References

Further reading

 
 
 

Coccinellidae
Coccinellidae genera
Articles created by Qbugbot